Vasant Sadashiv Pradhan (1914–2002) was a Bharatiya Jan Sangh politician from Madhya Pradesh. He was the leader of opposition of Madhya Pradesh from 1967 to 1972. He also served as finance minister of the state.

References

1914 births
2002 deaths
Leaders of the Opposition in Madhya Pradesh
Bharatiya Jana Sangh politicians
State cabinet ministers of Madhya Pradesh
People from Dhar district
Madhya Pradesh MLAs 1967–1972
Bharatiya Janata Party politicians from Madhya Pradesh